Frederick Thomas "Pompey" Elliott (7 April 1879 – 3 August 1960) was an Australian rules footballer in the Victorian Football League (VFL).

Family
One of nine children, the third son of bootmaker George Elliott, and Elizabeth Elliot, née Richards, Frederick Thomas Elliott was born at Eaglehawk, Victoria on 7 April 1879.

He married Adelaide Matthews in 1913.

Football

Melbourne (VFL)
He made his VFL debut for Melbourne against St Kilda on 13 May 1899.

Carlton (VFL)
Elliott made his debut for the Carlton Football Club in round 1 of the 1900 season. He had previously spent a year playing with Melbourne.

North Fremantle (WAFL)
He played for North Fremantle for the 1902 season.

Carlton (VFL)
Cleared from North Fremantle on 29 April 1903, he returned to Carlton.

He was named as Carlton's captain for the 1908 season, and became captain-coach when Jack Worrall resigned midway through 1909. Elliott retired from the game after the 1911 season as the first player to reach 200 VFL games.

Footscray (VFA)
He later played a single game for Footscray, the 1912 VFA Grand Final, being brought in to the team in an unsuccessful attempt to counter Dave McNamara, who was an influential player in Essendon Association's victory.

Military service
Employed as a tailor in Bendigo, Elliott enlisted in the First AIF in July 1915. He was wounded in action in August 1916. Having returned to Australia on SS City of Poona on 14 May 1919, he was discharged from the AIF on 6 July 1919.

Footnotes

References
 First World War Service Record: Frederick Thomas Elliott (3803), National Archives of Australia.
 First World War Nominal Roll: Frederick Thomas Elliott (3803), collection of the Australian War Memorial.
 First World War Embarkation Roll: Frederick Thomas Elliott (3803), collection of the Australian War Memorial.

External links

 
 Fred "Eli" Elliott, at The VFA Project.
 
 Fred Elliott, at Boyles Football Photos.
 Fred Elliott, at Demonwiki.
 Fred Elliott, at Blueseum.

1879 births
1960 deaths
Australian rules footballers from Bendigo
Australian Rules footballers: place kick exponents
Carlton Football Club players
Carlton Football Club Premiership players
Melbourne Football Club players
North Fremantle Football Club players
Footscray Football Club (VFA) players
Carlton Football Club coaches
Australian military personnel of World War I
Two-time VFL/AFL Premiership players
Military personnel from Melbourne